Leposternon mineiro is a worm lizard species in the family Amphisbaenidae. It is found in Brazil.

References

Leposternon
Reptiles described in 2018
Taxa named by Síria Ribeiro
Taxa named by Adriano Lima Silveira
Taxa named by Alfredo P. Santos Jr.
Endemic fauna of Brazil
Reptiles of Brazil